The Climate Law and Governance Initiative is an international consortium of partners in the climate law community working to build capacity and knowledge relating to law and governance approaches to address climate change. Ongoing research projects carried out by its partner institutions support the hosting of events and specialized capacity-building workshops in parallel with the annual climate negotiations under the UNFCCC. The initiative's focus is the effective implementation of SDG 13 on Climate Change. Its events are officially endorsed by the UNFCCC.

Events

Founded in 2014 and launched in the lead-up to the COP21 negotiations in Paris, CLGI has roots in a range of events, conferences and workshops dating back to the first meeting of the Kyoto Protocol (COP11/CMP1) in Montreal, 2005. Events over the preceding decade laid the groundwork for the Initiative.

Climate Law and Governance Day 2015
The Inaugural Climate Law and Governance Day (CLGD) was held in December 2015 at Université Paris 1 Panthéon-Sorbonne, bringing together climate advocates, scholars and practitioners to discuss the roles that law and governance play in climate-change efforts. Key participants were John H. Knox, Mary Robinson, Bianca Jagger and Bradnee Chambers, with Marie-Claire Cordonier Segger as chair. Its goal was to create a community of practice to support global climate efforts.

Climate Law and Governance Day 2016
The second CLGD was held at Université Privée de Marrakech in November 2016, and explored the development of the Paris Rulebook (later named the Paris Agreement Work Program, and agreed at COP24). Discussions focused on how domestic climate instruments could be crafted, modalities to mobilize climate finance, equity issues, and trends in climate litigation. Its outcomes were shared with delegates to COP22 in an official side event focused on climate-vulnerable countries. COP22 also saw the first full-day climate law specialization course to further empower delegates to utilize law and governance solutions to combat climate change.

Climate Law and Governance Day 2017
Held at University of Bonn, the third CLGD was opened by Hon Aiyaz Sayed-Khaiyum and centered on advancing law and governance contributions to global climate action. Key themes were how innovation could support the achievement of Nationally Determined Contributions (NDCs) under the Paris Agreement; the implementation of climate obligations; advancing climate resilience; and enabling climate finance. Its sessions were informed by a pre-COP event in Fiji in preparation for COP23.  CLGI was an officially endorsed event of the COP23 Presidency. The second one-day specialization course was held in conjunction with United Nations University.

Climate Law and Governance Day 2018
CLGD 2018 was held during COP24 at the University Silesia, Katowice, Poland, in December 2018. Discussions centered on the sharing of national experiences and best practices, knowledge exchange, and building a community of practice to support global capacity-building efforts. The day's programs were developed through a round table at the preceding intersessional meeting. Key participants included Christian Voigt, and Kamil Wyszkowski, President of The Global Compact Network for Poland.

Partners

Core partners
 Lauterpacht Centre for International Law
 Global Open Data for Agriculture and Nutrition
 Centre for International Governance Innovation
 Centre for International Sustainable Development Law

Intergovernmental organizations
 International Union for Conservation of Nature World Commission on Environmental Law (WCEL)
 United Nations Environment Programme Division of Environmental Law and Conventions (DELC)
 International Development Law Organization
 Center for International Forestry Research
 World Bank Division on Law, Justice and Development 
 European Bank for Reconstruction and Development
 United Nations Development Programme

Academic institutions
 University of the South Pacific 
 Universidade Eduardo Mondlane
 United Nations University
 University of Bonn
 Université Paris 1 Panthéon-Sorbonne
 Cambridge University
 Columbia Law School
 Université Cadi Ayyad (UCA)
 Université Privée de Marrakech 
 Yale University
 University of Chile
 Université de Kinshasa
 University of Toronto
 Université Hassan 1er de Settat 
 Ateneo de Manila University

Law firms and associations
 International Law Association
 International Bar Association
 Baker McKenzie

References

Climate change policy
International climate change organizations